Eddie James (born 10 August 2002) is a Welsh rugby union player who plays for the Scarlets as a centre. He is a Wales under-20 international.

Professional career 
James first played for the Carmarthen Quins youth team, and attended Ysgol Bro Myrddin. He attended Coleg Sir Gar, where he played before joining the Scarlets academy in 2020.

James represented Wales at U18 level, but the season was disrupted due to Coronavirus.

He was selected for Wales U20 for the delayed 2021 Six Nations Under 20s Championship. James spent another year with the side, featuring in the 2022 tournament.

To gain further experience, James went to New Zealand in 2022 to spend three months with Linwood RFC.

James was named on the bench for the Scarlets in their URC match against the Bulls on 27 January 2023, but was not used. He was again selected in the squad to play Edinburgh on 18 February 2023, coming off the bench in the second half to make his debut. James scored the final try as the Scarlets won 42–14.

On 10 March 2023, James made his first start for the Scarlets, in a friendly against the Saracens.

References

External links
 Wales profile

2002 births
Living people
Scarlets players
Llanelli RFC players
Welsh rugby union players
Rugby union centres
Rugby union players from Carmarthen
Carmarthen Quins RFC players